Spas is the name of several rural localities in Russia:
Spas, Kaluga, Kaluga Oblast, a selo under the administrative jurisdiction of the City of Kaluga in Kaluga Oblast
Spas, Babyninsky District, Kaluga Oblast, a village in Babyninsky District of Kaluga Oblast
Spas, Buysky District, Kostroma Oblast, a village in Tsentralnoye Settlement of Buysky District in Kostroma Oblast; 
Spas, Kostromskoy District, Kostroma Oblast, a selo in Shungenskoye Settlement of Kostromskoy District in Kostroma Oblast; 
Spas, Nerekhtsky District, Kostroma Oblast, a selo in Volzhskoye Settlement of Nerekhtsky District in Kostroma Oblast; 
Spas, Vokhomsky District, Kostroma Oblast, a selo in Vorobyevitskoye Settlement of Vokhomsky District in Kostroma Oblast; 
Spas, Kardymovsky District, Smolensk Oblast, a village in Netrizovskoye Rural Settlement of Kardymovsky District in Smolensk Oblast
Spas, Novoduginsky District, Smolensk Oblast, a village in Dneprovskoye Rural Settlement of Novoduginsky District in Smolensk Oblast
Spas, Danilovsky District, Yaroslavl Oblast, a selo in Vakhtinsky Rural Okrug of Danilovsky District in Yaroslavl Oblast
Spas, Poshekhonsky District, Yaroslavl Oblast, a selo in Vasilyevsky Rural Okrug of Poshekhonsky District in Yaroslavl Oblast
Spas, Yaroslavsky District, Yaroslavl Oblast, a village in Glebovsky Rural Okrug of Yaroslavsky District in Yaroslavl Oblast

See also
Spassk, several inhabited localities in Russia
Spassky (disambiguation)